Dragons Teeth are a small group of rocks rising to c. 100 m off Kanarata Point, the northeast extremity of Astrolabe Island, off Trinity Peninsula in Antarctica. They were photographed from the air and surveyed from the ground by FIDASE, 1955–57. The name, applied by UK-APC, is descriptive of these black tooth-shaped rocks.

Maps
 Trinity Peninsula. Scale 1:250000 topographic map No. 5697. Institut für Angewandte Geodäsie and British Antarctic Survey, 1996.
 Antarctic Digital Database (ADD). Scale 1:250000 topographic map of Antarctica. Scientific Committee on Antarctic Research (SCAR). Since 1993, regularly upgraded and updated.

References
 Dragons Teeth. SCAR Composite Antarctic Gazetteer.

Rock formations of the Trinity Peninsula
Astrolabe Island